Herbert Leonard Rosier (21 March 1893 – 1 March 1939) was an English professional footballer who played as a left back in the Football League for Brentford, Clapton Orient, Southend United and Fulham.

Career
Rosier began his career with non-League clubs Hanwell North End, Uxbridge and Southall, before moving to Southern League Second Division club Brentford alongside his brother in 1913. A left back, Rosier's progress was halted by the outbreak of the First World War in 1914 and he enlisted to fight. After the armistice, Rosier returned to Brentford and played in the 1918–19 London Combination title-winning team. After Brentford's election to the Third Division in 1920, Rosier made his Football League debut for the club in a 3–0 defeat to Exeter City on 28 August 1920. By the time of his departure from Griffin Park in February 1923, Rosier had made 127 appearances. He later played for Clapton Orient, Southend United, Fulham and Folkestone.

Personal 
During the First World War, Rosier and his brother, Alfred, served with the Royal Sussex Regiment and both were captured by the Germans in July 1917 near Monchy-le-Preux. Both brothers were interned in prisoner of war camps in Douai, Dülmen and Münster before being repatriated in November 1918. Rosier held the rank of private.

Career statistics

Honours 
Brentford
 London Combination: 1918–19

References

English footballers
English Football League players
Brentford F.C. players
Footballers from Hanwell
Leyton Orient F.C. players
Southend United F.C. players
Fulham F.C. players
Association football defenders
1893 births
Folkestone F.C. players
Southern Football League players
1939 deaths
Royal Sussex Regiment soldiers
British Army personnel of World War I
Uxbridge F.C. players
British World War I prisoners of war
World War I prisoners of war held by Germany
Military personnel from Middlesex